Hypsopygia postflava is a species of snout moth in the genus Hypsopygia. It was described by George Hampson in 1893 and is known from Sri Lanka.

References

Moths described in 1893
Pyralini
Moths of Japan